Arctic race can refer to:
A racial classification of people by Louis Agassiz, a 19th-century Swiss-American zoologist.
The territorial claims in the Arctic resulted in the early 21st century a series of expeditions to the Arctic area by Russia, Canada,  Denmark and the United States.
Circumpolar peoples

See also
Arctic Race of Norway

Culture of the Arctic